During the 1958–59 season, Red Star Belgrade participated in the 1958–59 Yugoslav First League, 1958–59 Yugoslav Cup and 1958 Danube Cup.

Season summary
Red Star won their first double in this season. Rajko Mitić played his last game for Red Star in the 1957–58 Yugoslav Cup final against Velež Mostar.

On 30 April 1959, Red Star played a friendly match against Milan.

Squad

Results

Yugoslav First League

Yugoslav Cup

Danube Cup

See also
 List of Red Star Belgrade seasons

References

Red Star Belgrade seasons
Red Star
Red Star
Yugoslav football championship-winning seasons